Conioscinella elegans is a species of eye flies in the genus of Conioscinella. It is found in Europe.

References

External links 
 Conioscinella elegans on www.eol.org
 Conioscinella elegans at insectoid.info

Oscinellinae
Insects described in 1910
Muscomorph flies of Europe